The white oak borer (Goes tesselatus) is a species of beetle in the family Cerambycidae. It was described by Haldeman in 1847, originally under the genus Monohammus. It is known from the United States.

References

Lamiini
Beetles described in 1847